Mendax  is a genus of  very small sea snails, marine gastropod molluscs in the family Cerithiopsidae.

Species
Species in the genus Mendax  include:
 Mendax barbarae Cecalupo & Perugia, 2017
 Mendax denatalis Cecalupo & Perugia, 2017
 † Mendax disparilis P. A. Maxwell, 1992 
 Mendax hebetatus Marshall, 1978
 Mendax marginatus (Suter, 1908)
 Mendax mascarenensis Jay & Drivas, 2002
 Mendax metivieri Jay & Drivas, 2002
 Mendax penneyi Jay & Drivas, 2002
 Mendax ribesae Jay & Drivas, 2002
 Mendax rufulus Cecalupo & Perugia, 2013
 Mendax samadiae Cecalupo & Perugia, 2021
 Mendax seilaformis Marshall, 1978
 Mendax spiritussanctis Cecalupo & Perugia, 2013
 Mendax subapicinus (Dell, 1956)
 Mendax tenuicostatus Cecalupo & Perugia, 2017
 Mendax theodosiae Jay & Drivas, 2002
 Mendax trizonalis (Odhner, 1924)
 Mendax trizonaloides Marshall, 1978
Species brought into synonymy
 Mendax attenuatispira Powell, 1937: synonym of Trituba (Paramendax) attenuatispira (Powell, 1937) represented as Trituba attenuatispira (Powell, 1937)
 Mendax duplicarinata Powell, 1940: synonym of Metaxia duplicarinata (Powell, 1940) (original combination)
 Mendax nucleoproducta Dell, 1956: synonym of Cerithiella nucleoproducta (Dell, 1956) (original combination)

References

 Powell A. W. B., New Zealand Mollusca, William Collins Publishers Ltd, Auckland, New Zealand 1979 
 Spencer, H.; Marshall. B. (2009). All Mollusca except Opisthobranchia. In: Gordon, D. (Ed.) (2009). New Zealand Inventory of Biodiversity. Volume One: Kingdom Animalia. 584 pp
 Spencer, H.G., Marshall, B.A. & Willan, R.C. (2009). Checklist of New Zealand living Mollusca. Pp 196-219. in: Gordon, D.P. (ed.) New Zealand inventory of biodiversity. Volume one. Kingdom Animalia: Radiata, Lophotrochozoa, Deuterostomia. Canterbury University Press, Christchurch.

External links
 Finlay H.J. (1926). A further commentary on New Zealand molluscan systematics. Transactions of the New Zealand Institute. 57: 320-485, pls 18-23
 Marshall B. (1978). Cerithiopsidae of New Zealand, and a provisional classification of the family. New Zealand Journal of Zoology 5(1): 47-120

Cerithiopsidae
Gastropod genera
Taxa named by Harold John Finlay